Alexandra Yakovlevna Brushtein (Алекса́ндра Я́ковлевна Бруште́йн; née Vygodskaya; 11 August 1884 – 20 September 1968) was a Russian and Soviet writer, playwright, and memoirist. She authored more than sixty plays, mostly for children and youth, but is most remembered for her autobiographical series Doroga uxodit v dal ("The Road Goes into the Distance").

Life
Brushtein was born in Vilnius as Alexandra Yakovlevna Vygodskaya. Her father was Jakub Wygodzki, a doctor and writer. Her mother was Yelena Semyonovna Vygodskaya (nee Yadlovkina), also from a medical family. Elena's father, Semyon Mikhailovich Yadlovkin, was a military doctor in Kamianets-Podilskyi. She graduated from the Bestuzhev Courses. She participated in the revolutionary movement, and was active in the Political Red Cross.

After the October Revolution, she participated in Likbez, the Soviet campaign to eradicate illiteracy. She organized literacy schools in Petrograd, and worked on creating a repertoire for children's theaters. In 1942 she joined the Communist Party of the Soviet Union.

She authored more than sixty plays, mostly for children and youth, and adapted classic works such as Uncle Tom's Cabin and Don Quixote under a pseudonym. She would become most famous for her autobiographical series Doroga uxodit v dal ("The Road Goes into the Distance"):

 The Road Goes Into the Distance (1956)
 At Dawn Hour (1958)
 Spring (1961)
 Flowers of Shlisselburg
 Evening Lights (1963)

She also authored a collection of theatrical memoirs, Pages of the Past (1952).

She died 20 September 1968 in Moscow.

Family
 Husband Sergei Aleksandrovich Brushtein (1873–1947), one of the founders of Soviet physical therapy. 
 Son Mikhail Sergeyevich Brushtein (1907–1965), participant in the Great Patriotic War, later chief engineer in a confectionery factory and inventor of techniques for producing confectionery.
 Daughter Nadezhda Nadezhdina (1904–1979), choreographer and ballerina, director of the dance troupe Beryozka.
 Younger brother Semyon Vygodsky (1892–1956), hydrological engineer.
 Uncle Gavril Efimovich Vygodsky, ophthalmologist and head of the department of eye diseases of the Leningrad Institute for Advanced Studies.
 His son Aleksandr Gavrilovich Vygodsky (died 1941), a historian.
 His daughter Yevgeniya Maksimovna Kolpakchi, a Japanologist.

References

1884 births
1968 deaths
20th-century Russian dramatists and playwrights
20th-century Russian women writers
Writers from Vilnius
Communist Party of the Soviet Union members
Recipients of the Order of the Red Banner of Labour
Jewish Russian writers
Russian Jews
Russian women dramatists and playwrights
Soviet dramatists and playwrights
Soviet Jews
Soviet women writers
Burials at Novodevichy Cemetery
20th-century pseudonymous writers
Pseudonymous women writers